The Anglican Diocese of Okigwe is one of twelve within the Anglican Province of Owerri, itself one of fourteen provinces within the Church of Nigeria. The  current bishop is David Onuoha.

Notes

Church of Nigeria dioceses
Dioceses of the Province of Owerri